A turntable is the circular rotating platform of a phonograph (a.k.a. record player, gramophone, turntable, etc.), a device for playing sound recordings.

Turntable may also refer to:
Lazy Susan or turntable, a rotating tray
Revolving stage in stagecraft for theater

Music
Turntablism, using the device as a modern musical instrument
"Turntable" (song), a song by TLC from 3D
"Turntables" (song), a song by Ciara from Fantasy Ride
Turntable.fm, an interactive music-sharing service

Transport
Railway turntable, a device used at some railroad facilities to turn locomotives or other rolling stock around
Car turntable, a motorized or manual device, usually installed in a driveway or on a garage floor, that rotates a motor vehicle to facilitate an easier or safer egress of the vehicle and/or eliminate backing up
Turntable, a part of an articulated bus or other vehicle directly over pivoting joint, which preserves continuity of a floor during articulation

See also